World of Frozen is an upcoming themed area based on Frozen. This land is currently being developed by Walt Disney Imagineering at Hong Kong Disneyland, Tokyo DisneySea under the name of Frozen Kingdom, and Walt Disney Studios Park under the name of Kingdom of Arendelle.

Storyline
Set after the events of Frozen and before Frozen II, peace and prosperity has finally returned to the kingdom of Arendelle and Queen Elsa has decreed a Summer Snow Day for the merriment of the kingdom's citizens.

Locations

Hong Kong Disneyland
On November 22, 2016, the Walt Disney Company and the Hong Kong Government announced plans for a multi-year, HK$10.9 billion expansion of Hong Kong Disneyland. The proposed expansion includes World of Frozen, Stark Expo, Castle of Magical Dreams, multiple new attractions, and live entertainment.

The land will be the fourth expansion that will open as part of the park's multi-year expansion from 2018 to 2023. It is projected to open in the second half of 2023 and will be located between It's a Small World (in Fantasyland) and Toy Story Land, which is part of the Disney 100 Years of Wonder celebration.

Tokyo DisneySea
On April 29, 2015, the Oriental Land Company revealed that the eighth port in development at Tokyo DisneySea would be called Scandinavia and was scheduled to open in 2020. This area was to be located to the south of the Lost River Delta port and will be roughly the same size as the Arabian Coast port. It was also supposed to feature multiple new attractions, shops and restaurants. However, the Scandinavia port has been cancelled in favor of expanding the Mediterranean Harbor with Soaring: Fantastic Flight as well as New Fantasyland in Tokyo Disneyland.

On June 14, 2018, Tokyo Disney Resort announced an expansion called Fantasy Springs would open in Tokyo DisneySea in 2023. Taking the place of the originally-announced Scandinavia port, Fantasy Springs immerses guests in the worlds of beloved Disney films, namely Frozen, Tangled, and Peter Pan. A new luxury hotel will also be connected to this port.

In October 2022, it was announced that opening date would be delayed to Spring 2024. It was also announced that the area would be called Frozen Kingdom.

Walt Disney Studios Park
On February 27, 2018, the chairman and CEO of The Walt Disney Company Bob Iger announced plans for a 2 billion euro and multi-year expansion for Disneyland Paris alongside French President Emmanuel Macron at the Palais de l'Elysée in Paris. The multi-year expansion will also include the transformation of the Walt Disney Studios Park. Aside from Kingdom of Arendelle, the park is set to receive the Avengers Campus and a Star Wars themed land, along with multiple new attractions and live entertainment experiences. It is projected to open in 2025, after suffering multiple delays.

Attractions
 Frozen Ever After
 Wandering Oaken's Sliding Sleighs (Hong Kong only)
 Playhouse in the Woods (Hong Kong only)

Restaurants and shops
 Tick Tock Toys & Collectibles (Hong Kong and Paris)
 Northern Delights (Hong Kong only)
 Golden Crocus Inn (Hong Kong and Paris)
 Bayside Wharf (dining in Hong Kong, photopass in Paris)
 Traveling Traders (Hong Kong only)
 Arendelle: A Frozen Dining Adventure (Tokyo only)

See also
 Epcot's Norway Pavilion, where Frozen Ever After debuted.
 Pandora – The World of Avatar
 Star Wars: Galaxy's Edge
 Avengers Campus

References

 
Walt Disney Parks and Resorts attractions
Themed areas in Walt Disney Parks and Resorts
Hong Kong Disneyland
Tokyo DisneySea
Walt Disney Studios Park
Fantasy Springs (Tokyo DisneySea)